This is a list of concert tours by Gloria Estefan, a Cuban-American pop singer.

Tour information
Since 1985, Estefan has embarked on six worldwide concert tours performing in several locations worldwide including the five continents. Estefan's first tour was with the Miami Sound Machine and was the tour for support of the album Primitive Love named "Primitive Love Tour" in 1985.  Her last tour in 2008, the "90 Millas World Tour," was made to promote the album 90 Millas.

Among all the tours made and listed here the first two are with the Miami Sound Machine, in which Estefan was the lead vocalist, since their separation in 1989, Estefan credited alone and embarked in four tours, two of them, the "Into The Light" and "Evolution" are cataloged as world tours, and are the most successful on Estefan's career

Gloria Estefan first tour with the Miami Sound Machine "Primitive Love Tour" was a tour only to the United States with a low budget and just performances of their album, since that tour all the other tours by Estefan had been praised and critically acclaimed, especially her 1996/1997 "Evolution World Tour" which was created with a very different concept and making it more a show than just a concert, it eventually became one of the fans favorites and was one of the most successful tour ever for Estefan.

With the release of the 2007 Spanish-language album 90 Millas, Gloria Estefan did a tour of the European continent to promote the album. Gloria started the tour in August 2008 in Valencia, Spain, and then went to London and also her first concert to a British audience since a decade. She also visited Belfast, Rotterdam and Tenerife. Estefan also performed at the Aruba Music Festival on October 11

In April 2009, Gloria Estefan she started her first tour of Latin America. She performed in Argentina, Chile, Uruguay and others Latin-American countries. This was the second leg to her last tour promoting 90 Millas. Due to the success of the last performances of Estefan to Europe, she will return to a series of music festivals included as part of this tour in the summer season in 2009, including three more cities: Milan, Locarno and Liverpool. She also added another three dates to the US, as part of a special concert with Carole King for a performance at the Foxwoods Resort Casino, the show being part of this tour is called "She Got's A Friend".

Tours

Notable concerts
Vh1 Divas Live
The Millennium Concert (December 31, 1999, American Airlines Arena, Miami, Florida)
The Atlantis Concert (April 19, 2000, Atlantis Paradise Island Hotel Resort, Nassau, Bahamas)
One Night Only (November 4, 2001, Mandalay Bay, Las Vegas, Nevada, USA)
One Night Only (November 11, 2001, Mohegan Sun, Uncasville, Connecticut, USA)
Live & Unwrapped (October 2003, The Colosseum at Caesars Palace, Las Vegas, Nevada, USA)
She's Got A Friend (With Carole King)

References

External links
 Gloria Estefan official site
Sony Music official site
 Gloria Estefan Mexico Fan's Official Site

E